Parque de la Conferencia is a park in Algeciras, southeastern Spain. Established in 2007 to mark the centenary of the Algeciras Conference.

References

Parks in Algeciras